The members of the New South Wales Legislative Assembly who served in the 19th parliament of New South Wales from 1901 to 1904 were elected at the 1901 state election on 3 July 1901. The Speaker was William McCourt.

By-elections

Under the constitution, ministers were required to resign to recontest their seats in a by-election when appointed. These by-elections are only noted when the minister was defeated; in general, he was elected unopposed.

See also
See ministry
Waddell ministry
Results of the 1901 New South Wales state election
Candidates of the 1901 New South Wales state election

References

Members of New South Wales parliaments by term
20th-century Australian politicians